Sundvollen  is a village in the municipality of Hole, in the county of Buskerud, Norway.  Sundvollen is located along the east side of Tyrifjorden where the E16 crosses west over Steinsfjorden,  the northeastern arm of Tyrifjorden, to Kroksund.  The village had 801 inhabitants as of January 2009.

Sundvollen (Sundvolden) was first the name of the local farm, which included much of the local real estate. The name is connected to the formation of the lake, which narrows in this area. In the census of 1801, 71 persons lived at and nearby the farm (both farmers and serfs with their families). From the farm, the hotel sprung, possibly as a wayside inn from first. As a crucial meeting point, the farm prospered from serving travelers going up to central Ringerike.

Sundvollen is most noted for the hotels, Sundvolden and Kleivstua.  Sundvolden Hotel is one of Norway's oldest hotels. It was  mentioned in written sources dating from 1648.  Kleivstua hotel s also an inn with long tradition. It was originally a coaching inn in 1780 which catered to travelers between Christiania and Ringerike. It was situated on the Old Royal Bergen Road (Den bergenske kongevei),  the historic road between  Oslo and Hadeland.  Kroksund bridge, an old stone structure at Sundvollen,  was included in the Old Royal Bergen Road. The road also formed part of the old Pilgrim's Route from Oslo to Trondheim.

Krokskogen is a forested area south of Sundvollen which forms part of Oslomarka.  The steep Krokkleiva  through Krokskogen was part of King Road (Kongevei) between Sundvollen and  Kleivstua.  The road was constructed in 3–6 meters wide at the end of the 1700s to raise the road standard with regard to increasing transport of charcoal to Bærums Verk in Lommedalen.

References

Other sources
Lønnå, Finn  (1992)  Langs Kongevei og gammel Drammensvei i Asker og Bærum (Asker og Bærum Historielag)

External links
Sundvolden Hotel
Kleivstua hotell
Krokskogen
Pictures of King's view, Krokskogen

Villages in Buskerud
Hole, Norway